Knocktopher (historically Knocktofer and Knocktover) is a village in County Kilkenny, Ireland. It is situated on the R713 road between the villages of Stoneyford to the north, and Ballyhale to the south. It was formerly situated on the N10 national route until being bypassed by the M9 motorway. It is also a civil parish in the eponymous barony of Knocktopher.

The village has two pubs, two shops, a petrol station, a three star hotel, a restaurant and a glass gallery. Knocktopher is also one of 12  baronies in the county.

History

An ogham stone was erected about a mile south of Knocktopher in the medieval period: see Ballyboodan Ogham Stone. A mile to the west was Sheepstown Church.

In 1312 it was listed as having four farmers holding between 5 and 74 acres of arable land, and 45 free tenants holding from as much as 2,520 acres of arable land all the way down to a one-house plot. Ninety-seven burgesses held 360 acres of arable land, and there was a settlement of betaghs farming 120 acres of arable land. Knocktopher was home to a monastery, built in 1356 by James Butler, 2nd Earl of Ormond for the Carmelite friars. Following the implementation in Ireland of the dissolution of the monasteries in 1542, it was acquired by the Kingsland branch of the Barnewall family, who later acquired the title Viscount Barnewall. Its only remains are part of a residence built upon the site. The Carmelites returned to Knocktopher in 1735, where they remain to this day.

Following the Norman invasion of Ireland, the Barony of Knocktopher was created. The first baron was said to be Griffin FitzWilliam, brother of Raymond le Gros known as Raymond FitzGerald. Gilbert fitz Griffin is cited as the 2nd Baron of Knocktopher and first owner of Knocktopher Manor. He died about 1203/4. By the 15th century the family of "Walsh of the Mountain" held half of the land in this barony. The lands are believed to have included the castles at Ballyhale, Ballynacooly, Ballynoony, Castlebanny, Castlegannon, Castlemorris, Clonassy, Cloone, Derrynahinch, Earlsrath, Inchacarran, Knockmoylan, Lismateige, and Manselscourt as well as civil parishes of Killahy, Kilbeacon, Listerlin, Rossinan, Muckalee, Aghaviller and Kilkeasy. Their lands were said to have been confiscated by Oliver Cromwell, c.1640, by which time the Walsh families owned much of the southern Knocktopher lands. Most of the remainder of the Barony was then owned by the Earl Of Ormond. In the census of 1659, the total number of Irish in the Barony of Knocktopher was recorded as 1301.

Knocktopher Abbey was established by the Normans in the 13th Century and was subsequently acquired with its lands by the Langrishe family. Today is a time-share resort.

The Langrishes of Knocktopher
The Langrishes of Knocktopher were probably its most famous residents, their influence and impact lasting through the generations to the present day. The Langrishe's seat for nearly 300 years, until 1981, was Knocktopher Abbey.

We are indebted to the permission of Art Kavanagh for these detailed references in the chapter of his book, ‘Langrishe of Knocktopher’, in a book entitled Kilkenny:  The Landed Gentry & Aristocracy (pub 2004).

It is believed that John Langrishe (1660-1735) was the first to arrive in Knocktopher.  After his first wife, Sarah Sanford, died in 1684 he then married Hon. Alice Blaney, daughter of Harry the 2nd Lord Blaney and widow of Thomas Sandford. Alice inherited the lands at Knocktopher when Thomas died in 1679. After Alice died, John became owner of those lands and married for a third time in 1695, to Mary Grace, with whom he had a child. According to Willian Nolan and Kevin Phelan’s book entitled Kilkenny: History and Society (1990), Robert Langrishe completed the outright purchase of the fee simple of their Knocktopher lands of over 800 acres in 1757, lands that had previously been held by them on a lease of lives renewable since 1698. Although John was married five times he had only one child, a son Robert (1706-1770), who succeeded John when he died in 1735. Robert was married twice, and he had one surviving son, Hercules  Langrishe (Herky, 1731-1811). Five of the eight Langrishe Baronets were named Hercules, and the current heir to the 9th Baronet title is also called Hercules (born 1988).

Hercules was MP for Knocktopher for 40 years from 1761 until Act of Union 1800. It is claimed that he achieved that remarkable feat of that time by buying up Knocktopher property and leasing it to Catholic residents. Hercules held posts of Commissioner of Revenue from 1774 to 1801 and of Excise from 1780 to 1801. He was honoured by being created a Baronet in 1777, thus becoming the 1st Langrishe Baronet, and was appointed privy councillor in 1786. He is, arguably, best remembered for his pro-Catholic Relief stance and his exchanges with his friend Edmund Burke on the issue. Sir Hercules introduced the landmark Catholic Relief Bill in 1792. He seconded the 2nd Bill in 1793 which was passed as the Catholic Enfranchisement Act, giving the vote to all Catholic landowners of a certain value. Sir Hercules and his wife Sarah Myhill of Killerney had six children, three sons and three daughters.

Their eldest son, Robert (1756-1835), graduated as a barrister from the King's Inns. He became an MP for Knocktopher (1783-1796), where both father and son sat together in the Houses of Parliament. In 1782 he married an heiress, Anne Boyle, a granddaughter of the Archbishop of Armagh. In 1796 he too became a Revenue Commissioner.  After Sir Hercules died in 1811, Robert became the 2nd Baronet, Sir Robert Langrishe. He was heavily involved in theatre. And after he died in 1835 his second son, Hercules Richard (1782–1862), who had entered the Church, became the 3rd Baronet, Rev Sir Hercules Langrishe. They had eight children with his wife, Maria Cottingham.  Sir James Langrishe (1823-1910) as 4th Baronet succeeded Rev Sir Hercules when he died in 1862. He married twice, became Lt Col. in the Army and High Sheriff of County Kilkenny 1866. They had one son, Hercules, and five daughters. Hercules Robert (‘Herky’, 1859-1943) graduated from Trinity College, Dublin in 1753 and succeeded Robert when he died in 1770 as Sir Hercules Robert Langrishe the 5th Baronet.  He was by all accounts a dashing young aristocrat, who developed powerful connections to King Edward VII. Famously in 1904, Hercules invited King Edward VII, whom he knew well, and Queen Alexandra to visit Knocktopher Abbey. The invitation was accepted but it backfired over a prank and the visit never happened.  He was High Sheriff in 1891 and reached Deputy Lieutenant in Army and served in Russia. He married Lady Helen Hume Dick and they had two sons.

In 1943 his son Sir Terence Hume Langrishe (Pingo, 1895-1973) became the 6th Baronet and served in World War I and World War II. He became a Lloyd’s name. He married Joan Grigg with whom he had three sons and the eldest, Sir Hercules Ralph Hume Langrishe (Heck, 1927-1998), succeeded him as the 7th Baronet in 1973. He had attended Eton before joining the Army and marrying Lady Grania Wingfield, daughter of The 9th Viscount Powerscourt.  They had four children, including one son who succeeded him in 1998 - Sir James Hercules Langrishe, the 8th Baronet (1957-).

The 9th Baronet heir apparent is the present holder’s son, Richard James Hercules Langrishe (1988-).

Achievements

Sporting
It has a soccer club - Southend United.

Its hurling club is Ballyhale Shamrocks. Knocktopher GAA Hurling Club amalgamated with Ballyhale Shamrocks and Knockmoylan GAA Clubs in 1972. The late Fr Anthony Heaslip, brother of Knocktopher man, Denis Heaslip, was credited with being central to the founding of Ballyhale Shamrocks. Since 1981 to date they have since won a national record number of 8 All Ireland Senior Club Hurling Championships.

Three Knocktopher-born hurlers have won Senior Hurling All Ireland medals with Kilkenny - Frank Cummins won in 1967 (non-playing sub), 1969, 1972, 1974, 1975, 1979, 1982, 1983, Denis Heaslip won in 1957, 1963 and Sean O' (John) Farrell won in 1933 (non-playing sub)  who played club hurling for Carrickshock GAA at that time - a club founded in 1928 when the teams from Hugginstown and Knockmoylan were amalgamated to commemorate the Battle of Carrickshock, 1831.

Sporting achievements are not new to Knocktopher. According to Art Kavanagh's book, Mary Langrishe, sister of Sir Hercules Robert Langrishe’s 1859-1943) and the 5th Baronet, was the Irish Lawn Tennis Ladies Champion on three occasions during the 1880s.

And Knocktopher Footballers won the Kilkenny Senior Football Championship four times - 1901, 1908, 1910 and 1911. In their booklet to celebrate the Ballyhale C.D.S. (1895-1995) Cooperative Creamery anniversary, they carry a photo of the Knocktopher football 1908-1910 squad and note too that Knocktopher were the backbone of the County Kilkenny football team of 1911, the year they won the Leinster Senior Football Championship, beating Kildare.  They were beaten in the All-Ireland Football Semi-final by Antrim that year, a feat never since surpassed by Kilkenny footballers. One of their best-known footballers of that time was Patrick J. Power, who was Manager of Ballyhale Creamery (1909-1920), and also represented Knocktopher in the Kilkenny team of 1911.

Other

The Treacy Clan record that Knocktopher had a well-known Cricket Team in 1884, among the best-known players being batsman, W. Power, and bowler, D. Treacy; that local competitors included teams from Ballyhale, Kilcurl, Knockmoylan, Hugginstown and Kilmoganny; and that the matches often took place on a cricket ground provided by Langrishes at Knocktopher Abbey. There were over 40 cricket teams in County Kilkenny at the time.

Other notable events included holding the National Ploughing Championships in Knocktopher in 1978. Kilcurl born Sean O' (John) Farrell was Managing Director of its Irish National Ploughing Association from 1958-72.

Public transport
The village is served on Thursday only by Bus Éireann route 365 from Thomastown to Waterford. However Ballyhale only 2 kilometres distant has numerous daily Bus Éireann and JJ Kavanagh and Sons services linking it to Dublin, Waterford, Kilkenny, Thomastown and Athlone. Thomastown railway station is approximately 9 kilometres from Knocktopher.

References

See also
 List of abbeys and priories in Ireland (County Kilkenny)
 List of towns and villages in Ireland

 
Towns and villages in County Kilkenny
Articles on towns and villages in Ireland possibly missing Irish place names
Civil parishes of County Kilkenny